Egerton may refer to:

People
 Egerton (name), a list of people with either the surname or the given name
 Egerton family, a British aristocratic family
 George Egerton, pen name of Mary Dunne Bright (1859–1945), Australian-born writer

Places
 Egerton, Cheshire, England
 Egerton, Greater Manchester, England
 Egerton, Kent, England
 Egerton, Nova Scotia, Canada
 Egerton, Southgate, Ontario, Canada

Other uses
 Baron Egerton, a title in the Peerage of the United Kingdom created in 1859
 Egerton University, Njoro, near Nakuru, Kenya
 Egerton (tug), a number of tugs with this name

See also

 Egerton Collection, a notable collection of manuscripts in the British Library
 Egerton Gospel, fragments of an unknown Gospel found in Egypt
 
 Edgerton (disambiguation)